Jafar Jamal (born 20 March 1990) is an Indian cricketer who represents Kerala in domestic cricket. Jafar has played two List A matches and 20 Twenty20 matches for Kerala.

References

External links
 

1990 births
Indian cricketers
Living people